Fernwood, California may refer to:
 Fernwood, Humboldt County, California
 Fernwood, Los Angeles County, California